The Organisation Armée Secrète (OAS, "Secret Armed Organisation") was a far-right French dissident paramilitary and terrorist organisation during the Algerian War. The OAS carried out terrorist attacks, including bombings and assassinations, in an attempt to prevent Algeria's independence from French colonial rule.

The OAS was formed from existing networks, calling themselves "counter-terrorists", "self-defence groups", or "resistance", which had carried out attacks on the Algerian National Liberation Front (FLN) and their perceived supporters since early in the war. It was officially formed in Francoist Spain, in Madrid in January 1961, as a response by some French politicians and French military officers to the 8 January 1961 referendum on self-determination concerning Algeria, which had been organised by President de Gaulle.

By acts of bombings and targeted assassinations in both metropolitan France and French Algerian territories, which are estimated to have resulted in 2,000 deaths between April 1961 and April 1962, the OAS attempted to prevent Algerian independence. This campaign culminated in a wave of attacks that followed the March 1962 Évian Accords, which granted independence to Algeria and marked the beginning of the exodus of the pieds-noirs, and in Jean Bastien-Thiry's 1962 assassination attempt against president de Gaulle in the Paris suburb of Le Petit-Clamart. Another prominent target was the existentialist philosopher Jean-Paul Sartre, who supported the FLN.

The OAS still has admirers in French nationalist movements. In July 2006, some OAS sympathisers attempted to relight the flame of the Tomb of the Unknown Soldier to commemorate the Oran massacre on 5 July 1962.

History 

The OAS was created in response to the January 1961 referendum on self-determination for Algeria. It was founded in Spain, in January 1961, by former officers, Pierre Lagaillarde (who led the 1960 Siege of Algiers), General Raoul Salan (who took part in the 1961 Algiers putsch or "Generals' Uprising") and Jean-Jacques Susini, along with other members of the French Army, including Yves Guérin-Sérac, and former members of the French Foreign Legion from the First Indochina War (1946–1954). OAS-Métro, the branch in metropolitan France, was led by captain Pierre Sergent. These officers united earlier anti-FLN networks such as the Organisation de Résistance de L'Algérie Française. While the movement had a broadly anticommunist and authoritarian base, in common with the political outlook of many colons, it also included many ex-communists and a number of members who saw its struggle in terms of defending fraternal bonds between Algerians and the colons against the FLN. In France the OAS mainly recruited amongst overtly fascist political groups. In Algeria its makeup was more politically diverse, and included a group of Algerian Jews, led by Jean Guenassia, who began armed resistance after a series of FLN attacks on the Jewish quarter in Oran. Some Algerian OAS members conceived of the conflict in terms of the French Resistance, and in contrast to later Gaullist depictions of the movement, it included a number of former Resistance members in addition to Vichy collaborators.

Resistance against Algerian independence commenced in January 1960, with further violence breaking out in 1961 during the General's Uprising. Daniele Ganser of the ETH Parallel History Project claims that Gladio stay-behind networks, directed by NATO, were involved, but no definitive proof has been found. Both of these insurrections were swiftly suppressed and many of the leaders who had created the OAS were imprisoned.

By acts of sabotage and assassination in both metropolitan France and French Algerian territories, the OAS attempted to prevent Algerian independence. The first victim was Pierre Popie, attorney and president of the People's Republican Movement (Mouvement Républicain Populaire, MRP), who stated on TV, "French Algeria is dead" (L’Algérie française est morte). Roger Gavoury, head of the French police in Algiers, was assassinated at the direction of Roger Degueldre, leader of the OAS Commando Delta, with the actual killing done by Claude Piegts and Albert Dovecar on 31 May 1961 (Piegts and Dovecar were executed by a firing-squad on 7 June 1962; Degueldre on 6 July). The OAS became notorious for stroungas, attacks using plastic explosives.

In October 1961 Pierre Lagaillarde, who had escaped to Francoist Spain following the 1960 barricades week, was arrested in Madrid, along with the Italian activist Guido Giannettini. Franco then exiled him to the Canary Islands.

The Delta commandos engaged in indiscriminate killing sprees, on 17 March 1962; against cleaning-ladies on 5 May; on 15 March 1962 against six inspectors of the National Education Ministry, who directed the "Educative Social Centres" (Centres sociaux éducatifs), including Mouloud Feraoun, an Algerian writer, etc. It is estimated that the assassinations carried out by the OAS between April 1961 and April 1962 left 2,000 people dead and twice as many wounded.

The OAS attempted several times to assassinate French president Charles de Gaulle. The most prominent attempt was a 22 August 1962 ambush at Petit-Clamart, a Paris suburb, planned by a military engineer who was not an OAS member, Jean Bastien-Thiry. Bastien-Thiry was executed in March 1963 after de Gaulle refused to grant him amnesty. A fictionalised version of this attack was recreated in the 1971 book by Frederick Forsyth, The Day of the Jackal, and in the 1973 film of the same name.

The OAS use of extreme violence created strong opposition from some pieds-noirs and in mainland France. As a result, the OAS eventually found itself in violent clandestine conflict with not only the FLN but also French secret services and with a Gaullist paramilitary, the Mouvement pour la Communauté (the MPC). Originally a political movement in Algiers, the MPC eventually became a paramilitary force in response to OAS violence. The group obtained valuable information which was routinely passed on to the French secret services, but was eventually destroyed by OAS assassinations.

March 1962 Evian agreements and the struggle of the OAS 

The main hope of the OAS was to prove that the FLN was secretly restarting military action after a ceasefire was agreed in the Evian agreements of 19 March 1962 and the referendum of June 1962, so during these three months, the OAS unleashed a new terrorist campaign to force the FLN to abandon the ceasefire. Over 100 bombs a day were detonated by the OAS in March in pursuit of this goal. OAS operatives set off an average of 120 bombs per day in March, with targets including hospitals and schools. Dozens of Arab residents were killed at Place du Gouvernement when 24 mortar rounds were fired from the European stronghold of Bab el-Oued. On 21 March, the OAS issued a flyer where they proclaimed that the French military had become an "occupation force." It organized car bombings: 25 killed in Oran on 28 February 1962 and 62 killed in Algiers on 2 May, among others. On 22 March, they took control of Bab el-Oued and attacked French soldiers, killing six of them. The French military then surrounded them and stormed the neighbourhood. The battle killed 35 and injured 150. On 26 March, the leaders of the OAS proclaimed a general strike in Algiers and called for the European settlers to come to Bab el-Oued in order to break the blockade by military forces loyal to de Gaulle and the Republic. A detachment of tirailleurs (Muslim troops in the French Army) fired on the demonstrators, killing 54, injuring 140, and traumatising the settlers' population in what is known as the "gunfight of the Rue d'Isly". In coincidence with the uprising of Bab-el Oued, 200 OAS maquis marched from Algiers to Ouarsenis, a mountainous region between Oran and Algiers. They tried to overrun two French military outposts and gain support for local Muslim tribes loyal to France, but instead they were harassed and eventually defeated by Legion units led by Colonel Albert Brothier after several days of fighting. Some clashes between the French army and the OAS involving grenades and mortar fire took place at Oran as late as 10 April. At least one Lieutenant and one Second-Lieutenant were killed by the OAS during the fighting.

In April 1962 the OAS leader, Raoul Salan was captured. Despite the OAS bombing campaign, the FLN remained resolute in its agreement to the ceasefire and on 17 June 1962 the OAS also began a ceasefire. The Algerian authority officially guaranteed the security of the remaining Europeans, but in early July 1962 the Oran Massacre occurred; hundreds of armed people came down to European areas of the city, attacking European civilians. The violence lasted several hours, including lynching and acts of torture in public places in all areas of Oran by civilians supported by the ALN—the armed wing of the FLN, at the time evolving into the Algerian Army— resulting in 3,000 missing people:

By 1963, the main OAS operatives were either killed or in jail. Claude Piegts and Albert Dovecar were executed by firing squad on 7 June 1962, and Roger Degueldre on 6 July 1962. Jean Bastien-Thiry, who had attempted the Petit-Clamart assassination on de Gaulle, but was not formally a member of the OAS, was also executed, on 11 March 1963. With the arrest of Gilles Buscia in 1965, the organisation effectively ceased to exist. The jailed OAS members were amnestied by De Gaulle under a July 1968 act. Putschist generals still alive in November 1982 were reintegrated into the Army by another amnesty law: Raoul Salan, Edmond Jouhaud, and six other generals benefited from this law.

Legacy 
Many OAS members later took part in various anti-communist struggles around the world. Following the disbandment of the organisation, and the execution of several of its members, the OAS chaplain, Georges Grasset, organised the flight of OAS members, from a route going from Paris to Francoist Spain and finally to Argentina. Grasset arrived in 1962 in Buenos Aires to take charge of the Argentine branch of the Cité Catholique, an integral Catholic group formed by Jean Ousset, the personal secretary of Charles Maurras, as an offshoot of the monarchist Action Française. This anti-communist religious organisation was formed of many Algerian war veterans and close to the OAS. Charles Lacheroy and Colonel Trinquier, who theorised the systemic use of torture in counter-insurgency doctrine in Modern Warfare: A French View of Counterinsurgency (1961), were members, along with Colonel Jean Gardes, who had first theorised counter-insurgency tactics during the Indochina War (1947–1954), Jean Ousset developed the concept of "subversion" referring to an essential enemy threatening the existence of Occident itself. Gardes arrived in Argentina in 1963, a year after the end of the Algerian War. There, he delivered counter-insurgency courses at the ESMA, which became infamous during the "Dirty War" in the 1970s for being used as an internment and torture center. Soon after Gardes met Federico Lucas Roussillon, an Argentine naval lieutenant commander, the cadets at the ESMA were shown the film The Battle of Algiers (1966) by Italian director Gillo Pontecorvo, during which the fictional Lieutenant-Colonel Mathieu and his paratroops make systematic use of torture, block warden system, and death flights.

The Argentine admiral Luis María Mendía testified in January 2007 that a French intelligence agent, Bertrand de Perseval, had participated in the "disappearance" of the two French nuns, Léonie Duquet and Alice Domon. Perseval, who lives today in Thailand, denied any links with the abduction, but did admit being a former OAS member who escaped to Argentina after the Evian agreements.

The financial crime expert Veit Buetterlin named the OAS as an example of a terror group which committed bank robberies to finance its operations. In a CNN interview, Buetterlin mentioned the attempted assassination of Charles de Gaulle as a historic example and related it to cases of the recent past where sanctioned parties are conducting cyber attacks on banks to acquire funds illegally.

Organisation

Chain of command 
The secret army was a three-part organisation, each segment having its own action commando squads.

French Algerian branch

Oranie district 
 General Edmond Jouhaud
Commander Pierre Guillaume
aide
 Charles Micheletti
civilian
 Colonel Dufour
replacing Gen. Jouhaud
 General Gardy
Capitaine 
Revolutionary Directory member
Christian Léger
Revolutionary Directory member
Jean-Marie Curutchet
Revolutionary Directory member
Denis Baille
Revolutionary Directory member

Revolutionary Directory member

Algérois district 
 Colonel Vaudrey
 
in charge of El-Biar, near Algiers

Constantinois district 
 Colonel 
 
aka the chouan de la Mitidja ("chouan of the Mitidja")

Metropolitan French branch

OAS-Métropole 
 Captain Pierre Sergent
Chief of Staff
 Lieutenant Daniel Godot
ODM-Métropole Director
 Jacques Chadeyron
APP-Métropole
 Captain Jean-Marie Curutchet
ORO-Métropole

France-Mission III 
 
aka the Monocle

Spanish branch

OAS-Madrid 
Short living dissident group claiming the organisation's direction.
 Colonel Antoine Argoud
 Colonel Charles Lacheroy
 Commander Pierre Lagaillarde

Commanding officers 
 General Raoul Salan
aka Soleil ("Sun" surname for Louis XIV of France)
Chief of Staff
 General Paul Gardy
Chief of Staff
 Colonel Yves Godard
Chief Aide
 Doctor Jean-Claude Perez
ORO Director
 Captain Jean-Marie Curutchet
ORO Director, replacing Dr. Perez on 1 January 1962
 Colonel 
ODM Director
 Jean-Jacques Susini
APP Director

Notable members 
 Antoine Argoud
 Bertrand de Perseval
 Jean-Pierre Cherid
 Roger Degueldre
 Albert Dovecar
 Paul Gardy
 Yves Godard
 Yves Guérin-Sérac
 Pierre Guillaume
 Roger Holeindre
 Edmond Jouhaud
 Pierre Lagaillarde
 Jean-Pierre Maïone-Libaude
 Claude Piegts
 Raoul Salan
 Albert Spaggiari
 Jean-Jacques Susini
 Dominique Venner
 Jacques Soustelle

In popular culture 

The OAS is referenced in Ian Fleming's 1963 novel On Her Majesty's Secret Service. James Bond's future father-in-law Marc-Ange, the head of a Corsican crime faction known as Union Corse, refers to the OAS in chapter 24, due to the OAS having a French military helicopter in their possession. Because of the OAS indebtedness to Marc-Ange and the Union Corse, the helicopter is loaned to the MI-6 – Marc-Ange/Union Corse coalition endeavoring to thwart Ernst Stavro Blofeld's plot to unleash biological warfare in the UK's agricultural industry.

OAS graffiti appears outside a bakery approximately eight minutes into the 1963 film The Bakery Girl of Monceau. Two minutes later, following the second appearance of the exterior, similar graffiti appears to have been removed from the facade of the bakery.

The OAS featured prominently in Jack Higgins' 1964 novel Wrath of the Lion, in which the organization fictionally manages to suborn the crew of a French Navy submarine and use it for missions of revenge.

Alain Cavalier's 1964 film L'Insoumis stars Alain Delon as a deserter from the French Foreign Legion who joins the OAS on a kidnapping mission.

The OAS features prominently in the 1971 novel The Day of the Jackal by Frederick Forsyth, and its film adaptation. The story deals primarily with a fictional assassination plot against Charles de Gaulle, where the organisation hires a British contract killer (the Jackal) to kill de Gaulle. Bastien-Thiry and the Petit-Clamart plot figure prominently in the early sections of the story. Forsyth also mentions the OAS in his 1974 novel The Dogs of War, with several of its protagonists having joined the movement. The fictional Colonel Rodin from Jackal is also alluded to.

The OAS is referenced in the Oliver Stone film JFK, as suspected conspirator Clay Shaw (played by Tommy Lee Jones) is alleged to have business connections with them. The plot to assassinate De Gaulle at the Paris suburb of Petit-Clamart is also mentioned several times in the film.

The 2002 movie Legion of Honor is about an Englishman who joins the Foreign Legion and is set in Algeria shortly before their independence and "OAS" is mentioned numerous times as well as shown in graffiti outside a number of structures.

The OAS is referred to in the 2008 film Mesrine: Public Enemy No.1 (L'Instinc de Mort), describing the life of French criminal Jacques Mesrine. The character of Guido (played by Gérard Depardieu) is a member of OAS. Guido mentions OAS multiple times and together with Mesrine he assassinates another OAS member, who in his last moments declares: "De Gaulle killed us".

Subsequent groups with ties to OAS 

In November 2016, an extreme right-wing terrorist cell calling itself the Organisation d’armées sociales (OAS) emerged in France. The acronym was a nod to the original Organisation Armée Secrète. It was inspired by Norwegian far-right terrorist Anders Behring Breivik and consisted of 9 people led by former Action Française activist Logan Nisin. The cell had planned attacks against kebab shops, places of worship (especially mosques), drug dealers and politicians: Jean-Luc Mélenchon and Christophe Castaner were specific targets. The group was taken down by French authorities in November 2017 before it was able to accomplish any attacks.

See also 
 Front Algérie Française, an earlier pied-noir nationalist group
 La Main Rouge, a similar organisation established earlier, sponsored by French intelligence agencies

References

Further reading 
 Aussaresses, General Paul. The Battle of the Casbah: Terrorism and Counter-Terrorism in Algeria, 1955–1957. (New York: Enigma Books, 2010) .
 Harrison, Alexander. Challenging De Gaulle: The O.A.S and the Counter-Revolution in Algeria, 1954–1962. New York: Praeger, 1989 .
 Henissart, Paul. Wolves in the City: The Death of French Algeria. New York: Simon & Schuster, 1970.
 Horne, Alistair, A Savage War of Peace:Algeria 1954–1962, New York: New York Review Books, 1977

External link

 
Anti-communist organizations
Far-right politics in France
Rebel groups in Algeria
Terrorism in Algeria
Terrorism in France
Far-right terrorism